The 1889 New South Wales colonial election was held between 1 February and 16 February 1889. This election was for all of the 137 seats in the New South Wales Legislative Assembly and it was conducted in 37 single-member constituencies, nineteen 2-member constituencies, ten 3-member constituencies and eight 4-member constituencies, all with a first past the post system. Part 1 (section 13) of the Electoral Act of 1880 had awarded the right to vote to 'every male subject of Her Majesty of the full age of twenty-one years and absolutely free being a natural born or naturalized'. The previous parliament of New South Wales was dissolved on 19 January 1889 by the Governor, Lord Carrington, on the advice of the Premier, George Dibbs.

Dibbs had assumed office shortly before the election after the previous Premier, Sir Henry Parkes, lost a vote on the floor of the Assembly. Dibbs' Protectionists never commanded a majority on the floor of the Assembly in this period.

Key dates

Results

{{Australian elections/Title row
| table style = float:right;clear:right;margin-left:1em;
| title        = New South Wales colonial election, 1 – 16 February 1889
| house        = Legislative Assembly
| series       = New South Wales colonial election
| back         = 1887
| forward      = 1891
| enrolled     = 
| total_votes  = 150,816
| turnout %    = 59.93
| turnout chg  = +1.69
| informal     = 2,641
| informal %   = 1.72
| informal chg = −0.02
}}

|}

Retiring members

References

See also
 Members of the New South Wales Legislative Assembly, 1889–1891
 Candidates of the 1889 New South Wales colonial election

1889
1889 elections in Australia
February 1889 events
1880s in New South Wales